Michael David Thomas (born 12 August 1992) is a professional English footballer who plays as a midfielder for Leek Town.

Career
Thomas made his debut on 29 September 2009 for Macclesfield Town in their 1–1 away draw with Burton Albion in League Two, replacing Paul Morgan in the 81st minute as a substitute.

On 29 October 2010 he joined Mossley on loan, and joined Leek Town on the eve 2011/12 season. In May 2012, Thomas was released by Macclesfield due to the expiry of his contract.

He joined Colwyn Bay in the summer of 2012, but after struggling to hold down a place in the first team, he moved back to Leek Town in October 2012.

References

External links
Macclesfield Town profile

Living people
1992 births
Footballers from Manchester
English footballers
Macclesfield Town F.C. players
Mossley A.F.C. players
Leek Town F.C. players
English Football League players
Colwyn Bay F.C. players
Association football midfielders